Melanocetus niger is a species of black seadevil, a type of anglerfish. They have big mouths, with plenty of long teeth, and numerous fin rays. It is endemic to the eastern Pacific Ocean off the coast of Chile.

References

Melanocetidae
Deep sea fish
Fish described in 1925
Taxa named by Charles Tate Regan